Lussy may refer to:

Lussy-sur-Morges, Vaud, Switzerland
Lussy in the municipality of La Folliaz, Fribourg, Switzerland
Lac de Lussy at Châtel-Saint-Denis, Fribourg, Switzerland
Melchior Lussy, (1529-1606) a Swiss statesman who represented the Catholic cantons of Switzerland in the Council of Trent